Silver Daggers are an American electropunk/noise rock band formed in 2003. Known for combining intense, atonal music with post-apocalyptic political ideas, they form part of the circle of musicians in close affiliation with The Smell.

Discography
"Shearing Pinx/Silver Daggers" - Split 7-inch - Arbor CDR (2007)
"New High & Ord" - LP/CD - Load Records (2007)
"Siked Psych: Not Not Fun Gold" - CD compilation - Not Not Fun (2006)
"Arbor" - CDR compilation - Arbor CDR (2006)
"Bored Fortress" - Split 7-inch w/ Death Sentence: Panda - Not Not Fun (2006)
"Zum Audio Volume 3" - CD Compilation - Zum (2006)
"Sea & Sea Music Factory" - CS compilation - Not Not Fun (2005)
"Silver Daggers" - 7-inch EP - Not Not Fun (2005)
"Art School, No Bleed" - Live CDR - Self Released (2005)
"Pasado de Verga" - CS - Not Not Fun (2005)
"Silver Daggers/Blue Silk Sutures" - Split 7-inch - Kill Shaman Records (2005)
"A Tradition of Destroying the L.A. Times Building" - Live CDR - Self Released (2004)

Line up
WKSM - vocals, synthesizers, trumpets, guitars, drums
Jackson Baugh - guitars, vocals, bass, drums, synthesizer
Jenna E. Thornhill - saxophones, vocals
Steve Kim - bass, noise, whistle
Marcus Savino - vocals, drums

References

External links
 Silver Daggers on Load Records
 Silver Daggers on Myspace
 Silver Daggers with !!! in OC Weekly Music
 Split 7-inch Review in Village Voice

Electropunk musical groups
American noise rock music groups
Noise pop musical groups
Punk rock groups from California
Load Records artists